Helle is a small river of Lower Saxony, Germany. It flows into the Spüligbach (a tributary of the Ilme) near Heinade.

See also
List of rivers of Lower Saxony

Rivers of Lower Saxony
Solling
Rivers of Germany